Tarsolepis is a genus of moths in the family Notodontidae erected by Arthur Gardiner Butler in 1872.

Species
Subgenus Megashachia Matsumura, 1929
Tarsolepis brunnea Cai, 1985
Tarsolepis fulgurifera Walker, 1858
Subgenus Stigmatophorina Mell, 1917
Tarsolepis sericea Rothschild, 1917 (=Stigmatophorina hammamelis Mell, 1922)
Subgenus Tarsolepis
Tarsolepis elefantorum Bänziger, 1988
(Tarsolepis remicauda Butler, 1872) (mostly treated as a synonym Tarsolepis sommeri)
Tarsolepis taiwana Wileman, 1910
Subgenus Tarsolepisoides Nakamura, 1976
Tarsolepis inscius Schintlmeister, 1997
Tarsolepis japonica Wileman & South, 1917
Tarsolepis malayana Nakamura, 1976
Subgenus unknown
Tarsolepis kochi Semper, 1896
Tarsolepis rufobrunnea Rothschild, 1917
Tarsolepis sommeri  (Hübner, [1821])

Distribution and habitat
There are about 15 species in the genus, which are distributed from India, Indochina, China, Korea, Japan, Taiwan through the oriental islands of the Philippines and Indonesia until New Guinea. The highest diversity of species is found in Indochina. The genus has been recorded from a wide range of lowland forest types. The larvae feed on the maple family (Aceraceae).

References

External links

Notodontidae